Frederick William Boath (born 6 May 1991) is an English actor best known for his role as Alex O'Connell in The Mummy Returns (2001). He now works as a marketing and advertising professional.

Career
He was replaced for the role of Alex O'Connell for the third movie in The Mummy trilogy by Australian actor Luke Ford.

Boath appeared in an ITV1 show called The Children. He played 14-year-old Jack, a troubled teenager; he said he could relate to the character as his parents divorced when he was young. In 2010 he played King Henry II as a teenager in The Pillars of the Earth.

Boath appeared as Benji Reed in the 2013 television series House of Anubis.

Boath graduated from Oxford Brookes University with a Bachelor of Arts, and completed an internship at London's The Red Brick Road, an advertising agency.

Filmography

Films

Television

Awards and nominations

References

External links

  Freddie Boath on Little-Stars

1991 births
English male child actors
English male film actors
English male television actors
Living people
Male actors from London
Alumni of Oxford Brookes University